Banadkuk Rural District is in Nir District of Taft County, Yazd province, Iran. At the National Census of 2006, its population was 2,010 in 674 households. There were 1,881 inhabitants in 658 households at the following census of 2011. At the most recent census of 2016, the population of the rural district was 1,500 in 573 households. The largest of its 263 villages was Banadkuk-e Dizeh, with 1,227 people.

References 

Taft County

Rural Districts of Yazd Province

Populated places in Yazd Province

Populated places in Taft County